Sergey Antipkin (born 28 March 1986) is a Russian volleyball player, a member of Russia men's national volleyball team and Russian club Fakel Novy Urengoy.

Personal life
He was born in Moscow. He graduated Institute of World Economy and International Relations in Moscow with a degree in financial management.

Career
In 2015 went to Russian club Belogorie Belgorod.

References

External links
 FIVB profile

1986 births
Living people
Sportspeople from Moscow
Russian men's volleyball players
Universiade medalists in volleyball
Universiade gold medalists for Russia
European Games medalists in volleyball
European Games bronze medalists for Russia
Medalists at the 2013 Summer Universiade